The Departamento de  Canelones  is one of the 19 Uruguayan departments. Its capital is Canelones.

Geography
Neighbouring departments are Maldonado and Lavalleja to the East, Florida to the North, San José to the West, and Montevideo to the South. Part of the southern border is formed by the Río de la Plata. It is the second smallest department of the country after that of Montevideo, but the second largest in population.

Located in the humid templated region, the average temperature is low compared to that of the rest of the country (around 15 °C), as are the levels of precipitation (up to 2,000 mm yearly, on average).

By area Canelones Department is the second smallest of Uruguay's 19 departments.

Topography and hydrography 

Canelones Department, is characterized by flat lands and absence of relief (like most parts of Uruguay), with small coastal sand dunes at the south, and with meadows and woods in the center, north and west.

The department is rich in waterways, with many rivers and streams. However, there are two rivers that stand out for their importance: the Santa Lucía River and the Río de la Plata, which is actually a sea of salt water. On the coastline formed by the Río de la Plata, there are many spa towns and their respective beaches.

Santa Lucia River, meanwhile, forms the northern boundary with Florida, which is separated by a bridge known as the Paso Pache.

Regions 
Despite being a small department, Canelones has a population of over 500,000 inhabitants and one of the highest population densities in the country with 114 inhabitants per square kilometer.

The department is divided into approximately 20 sections. Within these, there are significant populations centers, some of which have the status of municipality, while others are part of cities formed recently by decree, and then there are also those that do not have enough inhabitants and are therefore often considered simple population entities with no mayor or government, remaining under the direct jurisdiction of the Municipality of Canelones (in Spanish, Intendencia Municipal Canelones or Comuna Canaria), which is based in the departmental capital, Canelones.

History
Canelones was one of the nine original departments created in 1830. Over the years its boundaries have changed little.

Economy
Agriculture is one of the principal contributors to the economy of Canelones. The cultivation of grapevines is widespread, and the area is a major contributor to Uruguay's burgeoning wine industry. In addition, cereal crops – principally maize – are produced, as are a wide variety of fruits and vegetables. Tourism, in the eastern coastal area, is also a major source of income for the department, and has enabled the development of important urban centres, such as Atlántida.

Demographics

At the 2011 census, Canelones Department had a population of 520,187 (253,124 male and 267,063 female) and 222,193 (+44.25% than in 2004 (153,931)) households. The average household size was 2.3 persons.

Demographic data for Canelones Department in 2010:
Population growth rate: 1,095%
Birth rate: 14.83 births/1,000 people
Death rate: 8.45 deaths/1,000 people
Average age: 32.9 (31.4 males, 34.3 females)
Life expectancy at birth
Total population: 76.37 years
Male: 72.95 years
Female: 80.00 years
Average per household income: 25,087 pesos/month
Urban per capita income: 10,015 pesos/month
2010 Data Source:

(* Resorts of the Costa de Oro – ** Sum result. See main article for all censal areas included.)
Rural population

According to the 2011 census, Canelones department had a rural population of 48,219 (9.3%).

Government
The executive power is exercised by the Intendencia Departamental de Canelones. The Intendant is elected every five years with the possibility of reelection. The legislative power is exercised by the Junta Departamental.

On 15 March 2010, by the Act of Ley Nº 18.653, the following Municipalities were formed in the Canelones Department:

Source: Intendencia Municipal de Canelones
* Stated as 2004 estimates.
** Source: El Observador (2010)

See also
 List of populated places in Uruguay#Canelones Department

References

External links

Official website
Enciclopedia Geografica del Uruguay - Canelones (Spanish)
INE map of Canelones
Official map of the municipalities of Canelones.
Nuestra Terra, Colección Los Departamentos, Vol.16 "Canelones"

 
Departments of Uruguay
States and territories established in 1816
1816 establishments in Uruguay